Nordjylland Power Station is a coal-fired combined heat and power plant in Vodskov,  north-east of Aalborg, Denmark.  It is operated by the municipality Aalborg Kommune. The first unit at the site became operational in 1967, under the association "I/S Nordjyllands Elektricitetsforsyning". 
Its original name from the opening was "Vendsysselværket", and build to burn oil from the start, but prepared for reconstruction to also burn coal.

The power plant have had 3 coal fired boilers and a gas turbine. The gas turbine has an output of 25 MW and entered service in 1977, while unit 2, which went also in 1977 has a maximum production capacity of electricity of 305 MW and heat of 42 MJ/s. Unit 3, which entered service in 1998, has a maximum production capacity of 411 MW and a maximum heat production capacity of 490 MJ/s. Unit 3 was the first power plant in Denmark with a SNOX-system for exhaust cleaning.

The produced heat is used for district heating of Aalborg.

An electric boiler for district heating was inaugurated in January 2018. It can convert 35 MW from electricity to heated water, and can act as an back-up heating source for the district heating system. This electric boiler was envisioned in 2017 to replace some of the use of methane gas and oil for the district heatings backup needs, and sell regulations services for the electricity market.

Power lines 
While two power lines leave the station eastward to the famous Vester Hassing Static Inverter Plant, where HVDC Konti-Skan starts, two other 380-kV lines cross Limfjord just east of the power plant in two spans. Latter towers are the tallest electricity pylons in Denmark. Their considerable height results from the fact that they are equipped with a further crossbar for a 110-kV circuit.

See also 

 List of power stations in Denmark

References

External links 
 Nordjylland Power Station (Vattenfall)
 Nordjylland Power Station (EnergyMap.dk)
 Nordjylland Power Station (Aaborg Forsyning)

Energy infrastructure completed in 1967
Energy infrastructure completed in 1977
Energy infrastructure completed in 1992
Coal-fired power stations in Denmark
Cogeneration power stations in Denmark
Vattenfall